The Arboretum du Font de l'Orme is an arboretum located near the Gorges du Régalon in Font de l'Orme, Mérindol, Vaucluse, Provence-Alpes-Côte d'Azur, France. The arboretum contains about 20 species of identified trees, including four species of Mediterranean pine, and the forest house of the Font de l'Orme.

See also 
 List of botanical gardens in France

References 
 Balade en Famille: Merindol
 Tourist-Office.org description (French)
 Office de Tourisme d'Apt description (French)

Font de l'Orme, Arboretum du
Font de l'Orme, Arboretum du